Boeing (707) Boeing (707) (alternately titled Boeing Boeing) is a 1965 American bedroom farce comedy film based on the 1960 French play Boeing-Boeing and starring Tony Curtis and Jerry Lewis. Released on December 22, 1965, it was the last film that Lewis made for Paramount Pictures, which had produced all of his films since My Friend Irma (1949). It was remade in Malayalam in 1985 with the same title.

Plot
Bernard Lawrence is an American journalist stationed in Paris. A playboy, he has devised an ingenious system for juggling three girlfriends: he dates flight attendants who are assigned to international routes on non-intersecting flight schedules so that only one is in the country at any given time. He has their routes detailed with such precision that he can drop off his British United Airways girlfriend for her outgoing flight and pick up his inbound Lufthansa girlfriend on the same trip to the airport, while his Air France girlfriend is in a holding pattern elsewhere.

With help from his long-suffering housekeeper Bertha, who swaps the appropriate photos and food in and out of the apartment to match the incoming girlfriend, Lawrence keeps the women unaware of each other's presence in the apartment. They regard Lawrence's flat as their "home" during their Paris layovers.

Bernard is so happy with his life in Paris that he intends to turn down an imminent promotion that would require him to move to New York City. But his life is turned upside down when his girlfriends' airlines begin putting new, state-of-the-art aircraft into service. These faster airplanes change all of the existing route schedules and allow flight attendants to spend more time in Paris. Most alarming for Bernard, his three girlfriends will now all be in Paris at the same time.

Robert Reed, a fellow journalist and an old acquaintance, complicates Bernard's life even further when he arrives in town and is unable to find a hotel room. He insists on staying in Bernard's apartment for a few days. When he sees Bernard's living situation, he schemes to take over Bernard's apartment, girls, housekeeper and job while manipulating Bernard into taking the new job in New York.

Cast
 Tony Curtis: Bernard Lawrence
 Jerry Lewis: Robert Reed
 Dany Saval: Jacqueline Grieux (Air France stewardess)
 Christiane Schmidtmer: Lise Bruner (Lufthansa stewardess)
 Suzanna Leigh: Vicky Hawkins (British United stewardess)
 Thelma Ritter: Bertha
 Lomax Study: Pierre

Production
Boeing Boeing was filmed from April 8 to June 30, 1965.

As Curtis and Lewis both wanted top billing, their names at the beginning of the film spin around in a circle with an airplane nacelle behind them. For the film's trailer, the animation was repeated and neither name was spoken aloud. On the film's posters, the names made an "X", with Lewis' name going up from the bottom left and Curtis' name going down from the upper left.

The film is one of the first times where audiences were able to hear Lewis speak with his normal voice throughout. It was a departure from the clownish style of visual comedy his fans had become accustomed to.

Reception 
Writing in The New York Times, critic Howard Thompson called the film a "strictly one-gag frolic" and "just middling, passable nonsense."

Home media
The film was released on DVD and Blu-ray disc on February 14, 2012.

Legacy
The film was selected by Quentin Tarantino for the first Quentin Tarantino Film Fest in Austin, Texas in 1996.

See also
List of American films of 1965
Come Fly with Me, 1963 film
Coffee, Tea or Me?, 1967 novel
The Stewardesses, 1969 film

References

External links 
 
 
 

1965 films
1960s sex comedy films
American sex comedy films
American aviation films
Films about journalists
American films based on plays
Films directed by John Rich
Films produced by Hal B. Wallis
Films scored by Neal Hefti
Films set in Paris
Paramount Pictures films
Films about flight attendants
Films about infidelity
Films with screenplays by Edward Anhalt
1965 comedy films
1960s English-language films
1960s American films